Conor Classon is an Irish Gaelic footballer who plays for Ard an Rátha, representing them at all levels, and also, formerly, the Donegal county team.

He is from Rosbeg in County Donegal.

Playing career
Classon did not play at minor level but his rookie year came in 2010.

Along with clubmates Paddy McGrath and Peter McNelis, he was part of the Donegal under-21 squad which qualified for the 2010 All-Ireland Under-21 Football Championship final. He had earlier played for the county team throughout the 2010 Ulster Under-21 Football Championship campaign, a competition which Donegal won.

Classon made a substitute appearance in the 2011 National Football League opener against Sligo, replacing Ryan Bradley.

Classon made a substitute appearance in the 2014 National Football League Division 2 Final against Monaghan at Croke Park, replacing Odhrán Mac Niallais.
Known for his Scandinavian physique, he is valued for his strength, pace and his good hands.

Honours
 All-Ireland Under-21 Football Championship runner-up: 2010
 Ulster Under-21 Football Championship: 2010

References

External links
 

1980s births
Living people
Ard an Rátha Gaelic footballers
Donegal inter-county Gaelic footballers